Dworshak State Park is a public recreation area covering  along the western shore of Dworshak Reservoir north of Orofino in Clearwater County, Idaho, United States. The state park comprises three units: Freeman Creek, Three Meadows Group Camp, and Big Eddy Lodge and Marina. There are opportunities for boating, fishing, camping, swimming, water-skiing, and hiking in the park.

Wildlife
The residential animals that inhabit this state park are deer, kokanee, osprey, black crappie, bass, trout and bald eagles.

See also

 List of Idaho state parks
 National Parks in Idaho

References

External links
Dworshak State Park Idaho Parks and Recreation
Dworshak State Park Location Map Idaho Parks and Recreation

State parks of Idaho
Protected areas established in 1989
Protected areas of Clearwater County, Idaho
1989 establishments in Idaho